Khwaja Darwish Muhammad (846-971 AH) famous Sufi of Naqshbandī Sufi order . He was the nephew of Khwaja Muhammad Zahid Wakhshi.Khwaja Darwish Muhammad died on 1562 AD in Kitab, Uzbekistan, 100 km from Samarkand in the Shakhrisabz region of Uzbekistan. He passed his spiritual order to his son, Khwaja Muhammad Amkanagi. His shrine is in Kitab, Uzbekistan.

See also
Ahmad Sirhindi

References

Naqshbandi order
Sunni Sufis
Islamic philosophers
Hanafi fiqh scholars
Hanafis
Maturidis
Mujaddid
Hashemite people
Sufi saints
970 deaths